Right and wrong may refer to:

 Ethics, or moral philosophy, a branch of philosophy that involves systematizing, defending, and recommending concepts of right and wrong behavior
Morality, the differentiation of intentions, decisions and actions between those that are distinguished as proper and those that are improper
 "Right and Wrong" (song), by Joe Jackson, 1986

See also